Jean Hoffman (born 29 September 1893, date of death unknown) was a Belgian water polo player who competed in the 1912 Summer Olympics. He was part of the Belgian water polo team, which won a bronze medal.

References

1893 births
Year of death missing
Belgian male water polo players
Water polo players at the 1912 Summer Olympics
Olympic water polo players of Belgium
Olympic bronze medalists for Belgium
Medalists at the 1912 Summer Olympics
Sportspeople from Brussels
20th-century Belgian people